James "Ham" Pirret (22 February 1915 – 4 December 1976) was a New Zealand lawn bowls player.

At the 1950 British Empire Games in Auckland he won the men's singles gold medal. In 1954 at the next British Empire and Commonwealth Games in Vancouver he won the silver medal in the men's singles. Pirret competed in the men's singles at his third consecutive British Empire and Commonwealth Games in 1958 at Cardiff, finishing in sixth place.

Pirret won two New Zealand National Bowls Championships titles representing the Tuakau Bowling Club: the men's singles in 1957; and the men's pairs (as skip), with C. J. Rogers, in 1958.

Pirret died on 4 December 1976, and his ashes were buried at Tuakau Cemetery.

References

1915 births
1976 deaths
New Zealand male bowls players
Commonwealth Games gold medallists for New Zealand
Commonwealth Games silver medallists for New Zealand
Bowls players at the 1950 British Empire Games
Bowls players at the 1954 British Empire and Commonwealth Games
Bowls players at the 1958 British Empire and Commonwealth Games
Commonwealth Games medallists in lawn bowls
20th-century New Zealand people
Medallists at the 1950 British Empire Games
Medallists at the 1954 British Empire and Commonwealth Games